TNI or Tni may refer to:

 Satna Airport, IATA code TNI
 Tahitian Noni International, Inc.
 Taqramiut Nipingat Inc., an Inuit broadcasting organization in Quebec, Canada
 Telephone Network Interface; see Network interface device (NID)
 Tentara Nasional Indonesia; abbreviation of the Indonesian National Armed Forces.
 Texas Neurosciences Institute, a research and neurological clinical center
 Thai-Nichi Institute of Technology a private college in Thailand
 Transnationality Index
 Transnational Institute
 The National Interest
 The New Inquiry
Trichoplusia ni, the cabbage looper moth